Graham Troyer (born February 24, 1983), better known by his stage name Baracuda (formerly Baracuda72), is a Canadian rapper from Guelph, Ontario, currently based in Toronto.

Rap career 
Baracuda was an original member of the Plague Language collective founded by Noah23 and Orphan. Beginning in 2001 he collaborated with Noah23 under the name Bourgeois Cyborgs. They released one self-titled album in 2008. The duo broke up in 2012 and Baracuda is no longer affiliated with Plague Language.

Discography
Albums
 Tetragammoth (Plague Language, 2002)
 Bourgeois Cyborgs (Legendary Entertainment, 2008) (with Noah23, as Bourgeois Cyborgs)
 Knucklebone (Legendary Entertainment, 2008)
 Shut the Front Door (Fishgang, 2018) (with Killz)

EPs
 Monster Blood (2011) (with Jay the Kidd)
 Hydra (Fishgang, 2014) (with Modulok)
 Swann Vs. Baracuda EP (Swann Flu, 2015) (with Swann)

Mixtapes
 Do Tell (Plague Language, 2009)
 Instant Classic (Plague Language, 2009) (with Plague Language Fam)
 We in the Building (Fishgang, 2013) (with Killz)
 Diamonds on My Cereal (Fishgang, 2013)

Compilations
 Plague Language Compilation (Plague Language, 2009) (with Plague Language)

Guest appearances
 Noah23 - "Delta Wing Commanders" from Neophyte Phenotype (2001)
 Noah23 - "Guelph" from Quicksand (2002)
 Noah23 - "Twist of Fate", "Mechanical Bull" & "Data Hooks" from Mitochondrial Blues (2004)
 Livestock & Madadam - "Bomb Worship" from Walk Down the Street (2007)
 The Weird Apples - "The Great Nostalgia" from The Big Crunch (2008)
 Normal Oranges - "Christmas Fix" from $5 Mic (2008)
 Noah23 - "Rusty Robotz" from Rock Paper Scissors (2008)
 Noah23 - "Absolute Mystery" from Noah23 / Playpad Circus (2010)
 Jon Brando - "No Bummer Cut" from No Laptop Bummer Cut (2010)
 Noah23 - "Air Guitar" from Heart of Rock (2010)
 Notorious BEN - "Superhero" from Interdimensional Surfboard (2010)
 Noah23 - "Chains", "Off the Hook", "Crush", "Doom Freestyle" & "Westbound Freestyle" from Pirate Utopias (77 Lost Scrolls) (2011)
 Noah23 & Krem - "Out of Order" from The Terminal Illness EP (2011)
 Noah23 - "Enter the Void" from Occult Trill II: The Sun Rewinds (2011)
 Mohammad Escrow - "Worst Day Ever" & "Take Time" from Escrow Season (2012)
 Noah23 - "Warlocks" from Noah23 for Dummies (2012)
 Spz Chaote - "Rap Tyrants" from The Final Secret of the Illuminati (2012)
 Ceschi - "Work Song" from Forgotten Forever (2014)
 Noah23 - "Nuclear Heat" from Peacock Angel (2015)

See also
 Plague Language
 Canadian hip hop

References

External links
 Baracuda on Facebook
 Baracuda on Bandcamp 
 Baracuda on Plague Language
 

Living people
Canadian male rappers
Musicians from Guelph
Underground rappers
1983 births
21st-century Canadian rappers
21st-century Canadian male musicians